The Metropolitan area of Puebla or Greater Puebla is the fourth largest agglomeration in Mexico with a population of 3.199 million. This agglomeration includes 10 municipalities of the state of Puebla, and 13 municipalities of the state of Tlaxcala. It does not include the city of Tlaxcala.

According to the National Institute of Statistics, Geography, and Data Processing (INEGI), it consists of the following municipalities of the State of Puebla:

Amozoc
Coronango
Cuautlancingo
Juan C. Bonilla
Ocoyucan
Puebla
San Andrés Cholula
San Gregorio Atzompa
San Miguel Xoxtla
San Pedro Cholula
and the following municipalities of the State of Tlaxcala:
 Mazatecochco de José María Morelos
 Acuamanala de Miguel Hidalgo
 San Pablo del Monte
 Tenancingo
 Teolocholco
 Tepeyanco
 Papalotla de Xicohténcatl
 Xicohtzinco
 Zacatelco
 San Juan Huactzinco
 San Lorenzo Axocomanitla
 Santa Catarina Ayometla
 Santa Cruz Quilehtla

It may be considered one of the oldest inhabited areas in the world, as it includes the city of Cholula, the oldest still-inhabited city in America.

References

Metropolitan areas of Mexico